M. A. J. "Marja" van der Tas (born 14 June 1958 in Alkmaar) is a Dutch politician and (former) management consultant. She is a member of the Christian Democratic Appeal (Christen-Democratisch Appèl). From 1 February 2011 to 31 August 2016, she was mayor of Steenwijkerland. From 1998 to 2006, she was an alderman of Apeldoorn.

Van der Tas studied domestic science at Wageningen University and sociology of the Western world and Dutch law at Utrecht University. She worked in the field of public and senior housing and as an independent advisor for government and nonprofit organizations.

Marja van der Tas is married and has three children. She is a member of the Protestant Church in the Netherlands and used to be president of a local church council in Apeldoorn.

References 
  Dutch Association of Mayors biography

External links 
  Mayor Marja van der Tas, Municipality of Steenwijkerland website

1958 births
Living people
Aldermen in Gelderland
People from Apeldoorn
Christian Democratic Appeal politicians
Dutch management consultants
Mayors in Overijssel
People from Alkmaar
People from Steenwijkerland
Protestant Church Christians from the Netherlands
Utrecht University alumni
Wageningen University and Research alumni
Women mayors of places in the Netherlands